Ajdabiya was one of the districts of Libya. It lay in the northeastern part of the country. Its capital was Ajdabiya. As of 2007 it was subsumed within the enlarged Al Wahat District.

When Ajdabiya District was in existence from 2001 to 2007, it had, in the north, a short piece of coastline on the Mediterranean Sea. On land, it bordered the following districts:
Hizam al Akhdar - northeast
Al Wahat - east
Kufra - southeast
Jufra - southwest
Sirte - west

Ajdabiya District was also in existence from 1987 to 1995 when it covered a larger area, including all of the 2001-2007 Al Wahat District, and some additional area to the south.

Towns and villages 2001-2007
Ajdabiya, Al Hiri, Labba, Mawahi, El Agheila, Shawashina, Shurraf, Awjila, Zuwetina, Brega, Jalu, Jikharra, Marada, Masliwa, Qaryat Bishr, Rashida, Sultan

Notes

Former districts of Libya
Cyrenaica
Ajdabiya